Lawn, previously known as Roseland, is an unincorporated community in South Londonderry Township in Lebanon County, Pennsylvania, United States. Lawn is located at the intersection of Pennsylvania Route 241 and Lawn Road.

References

External links

Unincorporated communities in Lebanon County, Pennsylvania
Unincorporated communities in Pennsylvania